Vladimir Ivanov (footballer) may refer to
 Vladimir Ivanov (footballer, born 1973), Bulgarian football player
 Vladimir Ivanov (footballer, born 1976), Russian football player